São João Baptista is a freguesia (civil parish) of Cape Verde. It covers the western part of the municipality of Ribeira Grande de Santiago, on the island of Santiago.

Subdivisions
The freguesia consists of the following settlements (population at the 2010 census):

Achada Loura  (pop: 403)
Alfaroba (pop: 67)
Beatriz Pereira (pop: 66)
Belém (pop: 382)
Chã de Igreja (pop: 210)
Chã Gonçalves (pop: 169)
Mosquito d'Horta (pop: 118)
Pico Leão (pop: 572)
Porto Gouveia (pop: 534)
Porto Mosquito (pop: 819)
Santa Clara (pop: 5)
Santana (pop: 957) 
Tronco (pop: 166)

References

Geography of Santiago, Cape Verde
Parishes of Cape Verde
Ribeira Grande de Santiago